Janjgir-Champa is one of the 90 Legislative Assembly constituencies of Chhattisgarh state in India. It is in Janjgir-Champa district.

Members of Legislative Assembly

Election results

2018

See also
List of constituencies of the Chhattisgarh Legislative Assembly
Janjgir-Champa district
Janjgir-Champa

References

Janjgir-Champa district
Assembly constituencies of Chhattisgarh